Scottie's Pizza Parlor is a pizzeria with two locations in Portland, Oregon.

Description 
Scottie's Pizza Parlor is a pizzeria with two locations; the original restaurant is located on Division Street in southeast Portland's Hosford-Abernethy neighborhood, and a second operates on 21st Avenue in northwest Portland's Northwest District. The business makes 16-inch square and 18-inch round pizzas; varieties include margherita, pepperoni, and bianca (sauceless). Scottie's uses sourdough and makes mozzarella and ricotta in-house.

In 2015, Portland Monthly's Benjamin Tepler wrote, "You'll find poofy-rimmed, leopard-spotted Neapolitan pies cooked in a 900-degree Swedish electric deck oven but served New York-style, in cheap 18-inch rounds or big, foldable slices."  Ben Waterhouse of The Oregonian described Scottie's as a "tiny, Indiegogo-funded spot" serving pizza by the slice or pie.

History 

Scott Rivera opened the restaurant on July 29, 2015, with his business partner and then-girlfriend Amy Coplen. Previously, he had worked at Bread and Ink Cafe,  Ava Gene's, Baby Doll Pizza, and Handsome Pizza. In 2017, Rivera attempted a world record by creating the Centouno Formaggio, a 101-cheese pizza.

In September 2019, 15 employees at Scottie's decided to unionize with the Industrial Workers of the World; Rivera recognized the union. The restaurant's hours were reduced during the COVID-19 pandemic, allowing Rivera to experiment with baking breads and bombolones. He launched the pop-up Bomba PDX in November 2020, selling donuts with cinnamon sugar or various fillings.

The second location opened on December 16, 2022.

Reception 
Benjamin Tepler of Portland Monthly said in 2015, "The best slice at Scottie’s happens to be the simplest: pizza bianca, with melting heaps of creamy, fresh-made ricotta, fried basil leaves, and a dusting of crushed New Mexico chiles, all drizzled with olive oil." In 2018, Anthony Falco named Portland the "greatest pizza city" in the U.S., based on Scottie's, Apizza Scholls, and Lovely's Fifty Fifty.

Eater Portland included Scottie's in several lists in 2021: Waz Wu's "Where to Find Knockout Vegan Pizza in Portland", Nick Townsend's "15 Restaurants Worth Visiting on SE Division", Rachel Pinsky's "Where to Find Thick, Cheesy Square Pizzas in Portland", Zoe Baillargeon's "Where to Find the Cheesiest Dishes in Portland and Beyond", and Brooke Jackson-Glidden's "Where to Find Exceptional Pizzas in Portland".

See also

 Pizza in Portland, Oregon

References

External links 

 

2015 establishments in Oregon
Hosford-Abernethy, Portland, Oregon
Northwest District, Portland, Oregon
Pizzerias in Portland, Oregon
Restaurants established in 2015